The yellow mud turtle (Kinosternon flavescens), also commonly known as the yellow-necked mud turtle, is a species of mud turtle in the family Kinosternidae. The species is endemic to the Central United States and Mexico.

Distribution
Northeastern Mexico: Chihuahua, Coahuila, Nuevo León, and Tamaulipas. 
Midwestern and Southwestern United States: Arizona, Colorado, Illinois, Iowa, Kansas, Missouri, Nebraska, New Mexico, Oklahoma, and Texas.

Its current presence is uncertain in Veracruz (Mexico) and Arkansas (United States).

Description
The yellow mud turtle is a small, olive-colored turtle. Both the common name, yellow mud turtle, and the specific name, flavescens (Latin: yellow), refer to the yellow-colored areas on the throat, head, and sides of the neck. The bottom shell (plastron) is yellow to brown with two hinges, allowing the turtle to close each end separately. The male's tail has a blunt spine on the end, but the female's tail does not.

Lifespan
The yellow mud turtle can live for more than 40 years.

Diet
Yellow mud turtles are omnivorous. Their diet includes worms, crayfish, frogs, snails, fish, fairy shrimp, slugs,  leeches, tadpoles, and other aquatic insects and invertebrates. They also eat vegetation and dead and decaying matter.

Yellow mud turtles forage on land and water for food. In early spring their main diet is fairy shrimp they find in the shallows of their ponds. While they are burrowing, they will eat earthworms or grubs they encounter. Some studies show these turtles will eat earthworms that pass in front of them while hibernating. They also consume fish and other aquatic organisms.

Reproduction
Most female aquatic turtles excavate a nest in the soil near a water source, deposit their eggs and leave, but yellow mud turtles exhibit a pattern of parental care. They are the only turtle that has been observed that stays with the eggs for any period of time. The female lays a clutch of 1-9 eggs and stays with the eggs for a period of time of a few hours up to 38 days. It is believed that the female stays to keep the predators away from the eggs. It was also observed that the females would urinate on their nests in dry years. This is believed to aid in the hatch success rate of the eggs in dry years.

It is believed that in their natural habitat that spring rains induce the turtles to begin nesting. The eggs hatch in the fall and some hatchlings leave the nest and spend the winter in aquatic habitats, but most of the hatchlings burrow below the nest and wait until spring to emerge and then move to the water. This is believed to aid in survival rates of the hatchlings, because some water bodies freeze solid during the winter. Another benefit of waiting to emerge in the spring is that hatchlings enter an environment of increasing resources, such as heat, light, and food.

References

Further reading
Agassiz L (1857). Contributions to the Natural History of the United States of America. Vol. I. Boston: Little, Brown and Company. li + 452 pp. (Cinosternon flavescens, new species, p. 260).
Behler JL, King FW (1979). The Audubon Society Field Guide to North American Reptiles and Amphibians. New York: Alfred A. Knopf. 743 pp. . (Kinosternon flavescens, pp. 439–440 + Plate 313).
Berry JF, Berry CM (1984). "A re-analysis of geographic variation and systematics in the yellow mud turtle, Kinosternon flavescens (Agassiz)". Annals of the Carnegie Museum 53 (7): 185-206.
Conant R (1975). A Field Guide to Reptiles and Amphibians of Eastern and Central North America, Second Edition. Boston: Houghton Mifflin Company. xviii + 429 pp. + Plates 1-48.  (hardcover),  (paperback). (Kinosternon flavescens, pp. 44–46, Figures 6-7 + Plate 4 + Map 10).
Smith HM, Brodie ED Jr (1982). Reptiles of North America: A Guide to Field Identification. New York: Golden Press. 240 pp. . (Kinosternon flavescens, pp. 26–27).
Stebbins RC (2003). A Field Guide to Western Reptiles and Amphibians, Third Edition. The Peterson Field Guide Series ®. Boston and New York: Houghton Mifflin Company. xiii + 533 pp. . (Kinosternon flavescens, pp. 247–248 + Plate 20 + Map 67).
Zim HS, Smith HM (1956). Reptiles and Amphibians: A Guide to Familiar American Species: A Golden Nature Guide. New York: Simon and Schuster. 160 pp. (Kinosternon flavescens, pp. 23, 155).

External links

Yellow Mud Turtle, Missouri Department of Conservation
Yellow Mud Turtle, Reptiles and Amphibians of Iowa
Yellow Mud Turtle, Illinois Natural History Survey

Kinosternon
Reptiles of Mexico
Reptiles of the United States
Fauna of the Plains-Midwest (United States)
Fauna of the Southwestern United States
Reptiles described in 1857